Sivakumar Vijayan (born 17 May) is an Indian Cinematographer.

Early life and education
Sivakumar Vijayan was born in Chennai to a middle-class Tamil family and grew up in Chennai and Kolkata. He is an electronics engineer from Madras University and pursued a master's in Media and Entertainment business administration. His passion for film photography started during his college days and after completing his engineering he joined Satyajit Ray Film and Television Institute, Kolkata specialising in Motion picture photography (cinematography). His first independent film as a cinematographer was Vidiyum Munn (2013).

Career
After graduating from Satyajit Ray Film and Television Institute (SRFTI), he assisted cinematographer P. C. Sreeram in the film Paa (film) (2009), Ishq (2012 film).He was also cinematographer for the Tamil feature film Vidiyum Munn (2013) in which he was appreciated for the quality of photography and for the sense of framing by French critic Isabelle Arnaud. An article in The Hindu noted his work in Vidiyum Munn for creating the mood, textures, disoriented canted angles and other factors in the film which affected the audience at an almost subconscious level. He worked on a sports drama Iruthi Sutru directed by sudha k prasad, the film is a bilingual made simultaneously in Tamil and as Saala Khadoos in Hindi. Saala Khadoos movie released in 2016 and became both critically acclaimed and box office hit. Even the film critic subash k jha appreciated his cinematography in Saala khadoos and mentioned him as the third hero of the film.

Personal life
He lives in Chennai.

Filmography

As cinematographer

Short films

As assistant cinematographer

References

External links 

 Sivakumar Vijayan on Facebook
 Official website

Satyajit Ray Film and Television Institute alumni
1982 births
Living people
Hindi film cinematographers
Artists from Chennai
Cinematographers from Tamil Nadu
Tamil film cinematographers